The 2012–13 season was Port Vale's 101st season of football in the English Football League, and fifth successive season in League Two. The club secured promotion into League One with a third-place finish. Administration scuppered the club's promotion chances in the previous campaign, and high-profile departures in the summer meant that manager Micky Adams had to rebuild his team from the ground up. His rebuilding efforts were severely hampered when Keith Ryder's expected takeover collapsed. The club was instead taken over by Paul Wildes on 20 November.

There were no lengthy cup runs, as Vale exited the League Cup with an opening day defeat to Championship club Burnley, and were knocked out of the FA Cup at the Second Round with a loss away at League One side Sheffield United, before their progress in the Football League Trophy was halted by League Two rivals Bradford City. This allowed the "Valiants" to focus on gaining promotion, and their goal-scoring feats took them up to second place by 15 September, behind only defensive masters Gillingham. With the new owners in place, Adams could afford to sign experienced players in the January transfer window, and the team pushed on to establish themselves as the division's leaders. However the wheels then fell off as Vale struggled to score as they showed relegation form heading on from mid-February. After just one win in eight games, Vale rediscovered their previous form by mid-March and went on to beat fourth-placed Burton Albion 7–1 in front of 10,978 supporters on 5 April. Promotion was secured 15 days later with a 2–2 draw with Northampton Town before a home crowd of 12,496. After promotion was secured Paul Wildes resigned as chairman and Norman Smurthwaite took full control of the club.

Overview

League Two
On 19 June 2012, Port Vale were given odds of 40 to 1 of gaining promotion. The club had lost some its best players as versatile defender Lee Collins, midfield general Anthony Griffith, and top-scorers Sean Rigg and Marc Richards all signed big money deals elsewhere – the latter two moving to club's expecting to win promotion out of League Two.

With the club's new owner in place, Adams signed six players early in July. He first signed midfielder Darren Murphy and winger Jennison Myrie-Williams (who had impressed in a loan spell at the club the previous season) from Stevenage, as well as Colchester United attacker Ashley Vincent. He then made another triple swoop by bringing in Shrewsbury Town goalkeeper Chris Neal, Crewe Alexandra centre-back David Artell, and former Wales international Richard Duffy. Highly rated striker Liam Dickinson, veteran forward Darren Byfield, and Irish attacker Tadhg Purcell also joined the club on trial. Adams appointed Doug Loft as club captain at the end of July. The pre-season tour of Ireland was hailed as a success, whilst Vale recorded wins in each of their encounters with non-league opposition. However, David Artell left the club as a free agent days before the start of the season, as he refused to sign a contract that reflected the club's status as 'in administration' (the initial contract he signed listed Keith Ryder as the club's owner, and was therefore invalid).

The team got off to a solid start in August, recording wins over a poor Barnet side and a much more resilient Morecambe. They lost away at Accrington Stanley despite having 56% possession and 12 attempts on goal. They continued their form into September, as 14 points from a possible 18 left them sitting second in the table. Only a bizarre own goal from Brian Saah won them a point at home to Torquay United, before Tom Pope hit four against former club Rotherham United in a 6–2 victory; the win over Steve Evans's big spending "Millers" sent a message to the rest of the division that Vale were genuine promotion candidates. They then came from behind to win away at Plymouth Argyle, before putting a highly impressive Fleetwood Town to the sword with a 5–2 away victory. A top-of-table clash with Gillingham at Vale Park ended the "Valiants" impressive run, as the visitors claimed a 2–0 victory with a professional performance. Having named the same first eleven for nine successive games, Adams introduced Rob Taylor and Ryan Burge at the expense of central midfielders Sam Morsy and Chris Shuker, and was rewarded with a 1–0 win over high-flying Bradford City in front of over 11,000 spectators at Valley Parade. Micky Adams was named as Manager of the Month and Pope was named as Player of the Month.

October opened with a dismal home draw with Dagenham & Redbridge, with goalkeeper Chris Neal making an uncharacteristic error to allow a blunted "Daggers" attack to claim an unlikely goal. The team then rallied to produce a convincing 2–0 win away at fourth-placed Exeter City, Pope's two goals taking him into double figures with 35 league games yet to play. However injuries took hold of the small squad, with captain Loft sidelined with a calf injury, and winger Lewis Haldane forced to announce his retirement after failing to recover from a broken leg he sustained in August 2011. They played Oxford United on a Monday night in front of the Sky Sports cameras, and did themselves justice with a convincing 3–0 win, with both Ashley Vincent and Sam Morsy scoring impressive goals. An injury/suspension crisis in midfield then did little to prevent a patched up Vale side to come from behind to beat Gareth Ainsworth's Wycombe Wanderers 4–1. They then travelled to Staffordshire rivals Burton Albion, and battled to a 1–1 draw after falling behind to a fluke goal. The month ended on a sour note at Sixfields, as John McCombe was sent off after breaking the leg of Northampton Town goalscorer Alex Nicholls; injuries and suspensions left teenagers Joe Davis and Kingsley James to form a makeshift centre-back partnership, though the score was kept to a respectable 2–0. For a second successive time, a Vale player was named the division's Player of the Month; Ashley Vincent took the award, but credited his teammates, saying "this award is as much for them as it is for me".

Vale went three league games without a win on 6 November, as they lost a two-goal lead to draw 2–2 at home with Rochdale; the game turned on Sam Morsy's sending off on the 67 minute mark. Three days later, Adams boosted his midfield by signing former Shrewsbury player Sean McAllister to an eight-week deal. A day later and Vale travelled to Roots Hall and came away with a point following a goalless draw. Vale then went five league games without a win, after throwing away a two-goal lead for the second successive home game, to draw 2–2 with York City. Adams said "It's not a time for people to criticise and get on the players' backs, so I'll have to put my arm around a few of them, even if I feel like strangling them at times." His team duly went on to record a simple 4–0 win over Bristol Rovers, with Pope's hat-trick taking him to 20 goals in the season. On 22 November, Liam Chilvers re-signed on loan from AFC Telford United in order to provide more options in defence. Notts County striker Lee Hughes was also reported to have joined the club on loan, with a view to a permanent move; however, the next day it was revealed that the loan move would not go through as the relevant paperwork had not been sent in to the Football League on time. Vale carried on scoring goals regardless, ending the month with a 3–1 win in miserable conditions at Aldershot Town. They also welcomed Calvin Andrew, who was signed to provide cover for Tom Pope.

Vale went into the festive schedule with a 2–0 home defeat to Chesterfield, who boasted four former "Valiants" in their team, including goal scorer Jay O'Shea. Adams tried to boost the team's confidence and said he then did "a bit of psychology with the players... sat them down, one-on-one, and reminded them about what and where they are." The talks seemed to work, as a Louis Dodds goal ensured that they came from behind at third-place Cheltenham Town to record a 1–1 draw. Assistant manager Mark Grew also employed psychology, telling the media that "We have the ability to bring people in, but hopefully we won't have to... if we lose three or four games, then the gaffer might have to freshen things up... but if we can pick up maybe nine points over Christmas and new year, then we wouldn't have a problem." On Boxing day, Vale headed to the New York Stadium for the first time, and completed the double over Rotherham with a 2–1 win. They then ended the year top of the table, after beating the "Daggers" 3–2 in rain-soaked conditions.

The new year was welcomed with a poor showing at home to Fleetwood, that ended in a 2–0 loss. There was good and bad news on 3 January, as Trinidad and Tobago international midfielder Chris Birchall was re-signed to the club as John McCombe was ruled out injured for "at least six weeks". Adams responded to the defeat to Fleetwood by making six changes at home to Plymouth, and was rewarded with a comprehensive 4–0 win over a struggling team reduced to ten men in the first half. He also signed experienced Argyle centre-back and captain Darren Purse. Gareth Owen and Darren Murphy both left the club, whilst veteran striker Lee Hughes was signed from Notts County. Liam Chilvers was also signed up until the end of the season. Both Purse and Hughes were handed debuts for the top of the table clash with Gillingham on 12 January, and played vital roles in the team's 2–1 victory. Adams then added another new face, with left-sided Sheffield Wednesday player Daniel Jones signed on until the end of the season. With the influx of defenders limiting first team opportunities, Clayton McDonald joined Bristol Rovers on loan until the end of the season. Jones scored on his debut, helping Vale to earn a point away at AFC Wimbledon in front of the television cameras.

New signings Hughes and Purse gave Vale a 3–0 home win over Accrington on 2 February. Three days later bottom club Wimbledon arrived at Vale Park, and Vale won the game 3–0 thanks to goals from Hughes and Vincent (2). The next challenge was another club battling against relegation, Barnet, and Adams named the same team for the fourth successive game; however for only the second time in the season Vale fans witnessed a goalless draw. Mid-table Morecambe then arrived at Vale Park as the club honoured former chairman Bill Bell, who died on 12 February; the game ended with a 1–0 defeat to ten-man Morecambe. Calvin Andrew was given a surprise start at Torquay, and rewarded Micky Adams with the only goal of the game. However Vale then tasted a 2–0 defeat at home to play-off hopefuls Exeter City, who put in a superb performance; Adams nevertheless found his team's lack of urgency going forward as a "little bit baffling".

Oxford beat Vale 2–1 on 2 March, ending Vale's five-month unbeaten run on the road. Adams then tried to add some steel to his midfield by re-signing tough-tackling Anthony Griffith from Leyton Orient. League Cup finalists Bradford then came to Burslem, and left with a point after the first goalless draw at Vale Park of the season. With the gap between Vale and play-offs getting ever more slender, Southend then successfully defended a two-goal lead at half-time to beat Vale 2–1. Adams admitted that "Promotion seems a million miles away with the way we're playing." Things then went from bad to worse at Bristol Rovers, with former Stoke player Ryan Brunt giving the "Gas" a 2–0 win whilst Ashley Vincent suffered a season-ending injury. Adams claimed that "idiots" in a "certain section of the crowd" were giving him "personal" abuse following the run of bad results and his decision to drop fan favourite Ryan Burge for disciplinary reasons. Full-back Adam Yates later said this low-point motivated the players to pull together to prove wrong fans that had barracked Adams. Burge was suspended for two weeks after refusing to apologize for making veiled criticism of the club on Twitter. Vale then put a poor York side to the sword with goals from Myrie-Williams and Hughes. Cheltenham Town proved a much sterner challenge, but Vale recovered from 2–1 down to win a crucial match 3–2, with Tom Pope hitting his third hat-trick of the season.

Vale were holding onto second place going into April, and though they failed to capitalize on their rivals dropping points on 1 April, they managed to come from behind to two Marc Richards goals at Chesterfield to secure a point. Four days later, Vale hosted fourth placed Burton Albion, in what was labelled as the biggest game of the season for the "Valiants". Reduced tickets of £9 ensured a crowd of 10,978, and they were treated to a comprehensive 7–1 victory as Lee Hughes scored a hat-trick. Bottom-placed Aldershot were the visitors four days later, and were seemingly fired up after manager Andy Scott took offense to Adams saying that "[Aldershot] are down the bottom because [they] deserve to be"; Scott stated that "Sometimes managers say things to deflect from what is going on at their own club. We will find out if they have got the stomach for the fight and see if they want to get promoted as they have got a few clubs chasing them." The match proved to be low on action, and Vale surrendered a half-time lead to draw the game 1–1. On 12 April, it was confirmed that Burge had left the club by mutual consent. Vale could have won promotion the following day, and seemed to have done so after Liam Chilvers made amends for a horrific first half own goal by heading Vale into the lead on 89 minutes; however an injury-time equalizer left the Vale still just short of their final target. Automatic promotion was effectively secured with a 2–2 draw against Northampton Town on 20 April, the two unlikely goalscorers were Chilvers and former "Valiant" turned "Cobbler" Lee Collins. Promotion was confirmed with a 1–1 draw with Wycombe at Adams Park on the last day of the season, in what was former favourite Gareth Ainsworth's last game as a player.

At the end of the season all out-of-contract players were rewarded with a contract offer, except for Darren Purse, Calvin Andrew, Clayton McDonald, and Kingsley James. Ashley Vincent rejected his contract, choosing instead to leave the club. Despite still being under contract, John McCombe chose to leave the club by mutual consent. Sam Morsy was the third to leave the club, after he rejected the two-year contract on offer in order to sign with Chesterfield.

Finances & ownership issues

The trauma of administration still afflicted Port Vale during the 2012–13 season, as Micky Adams was unable to sign any players until the club's new owner, Keith Ryder, was granted clearance from the Football League. The takeover deal was delayed for a number of weeks after Ryder faced difficulties in passing the league's 'fit and proper persons' test. The administrators lost patience in Ryder, and publicly stated that if Ryder did not pay the £1.3 million takeover sum before 1 August 2012 then his bid would be rejected, and 'plan B' would be implemented. The deadline passed without comment from either party. Confusion reigned as the administrators confirmed that they were open to negotiations with other parties, and that it was up to Ryder to complete his takeover, as he had the opportunity, the funds and – according to Ryder himself – the inclination to complete his takeover. Administrator Bob Young stated that "We initially gave him a deadline of the end of June, which was then extended to 6 July. If someone comes back to us with the funding first, then we will obviously take that forward." Ryder responded that "I wake up every morning believing this is the day we will complete the takeover. If the deal does not go through, and someone else buys the club, there will be no-one more disappointed than me."

The time sensitive nature of the situation was emphasized when the club revealed that the two pre-season friendlies at Vale Park would be played behind closed doors "as the club has been unable to carry out usual maintenance work during the closed season owing to the prolonged period in administration." The 18 players who signed new contracts in the summer did so on the understanding that Ryder would be the club's owner, and so when told that they had to sign revised contracts that offered less security they sought the advice of the Professional Footballers' Association – they technically remained free agents, free to join another club, until either they agreed to the revised contracts or until Ryder completed his takeover. All but one of the players agreed to sign revised contracts, allowing the club to at least start the season with a full complement of senior players. Ryder disappeared from the scene completely, losing some £170,000 he had spent on a non-refundable deposit and some pre-seasons costs. The off-field problems even extended to the first team kit, as they spent the pre-season in only the grey away strip and played the League Cup First Round game in a pink strip. This was because of a problem supplying the black and white home kit. The new away black and gold kit was released in mid-September, and the new home kit was released the following month. Fans could purchase seasons tickets for between £272 and £356, and could purchase matchday tickets for between £20 and £21.

At the end of September, Bob Young said that he was hopeful of selling the club by the end of October at the earliest, and that he would "be disappointed if we haven't sold the club by the end of the year". The new preferred bidder was revealed to be Wirral-based businessman Paul Wildes. On 17 November, the Roy Sproson status was revealed, as was new home shirt sponsor UK Windows Systems Ltd. Wildes completed his £1.25 million takeover of the club on 20 November.

After promotion was secured, Smurthwaite said that "I've never had any hobbies to speak of, but buying Port Vale has given me a passion. The club has reinvigorated me – it has saved me really, given me a new purpose." On 18 May, Paul Wildes made a shock decision to resign as chairman and sell his 50% stake to Smurthwaite, who became the club's chairman and sole owner; Wildes stated that "From many conversations with Norman, it's clear we have conflicting ideas on how to take Vale forward". It was revealed that Smurthwaite had funded the initial takeover, and that the pair had a disagreement following defeat to Bristol Rovers in March, with Smurthwaite insisting on a more public approach to take pressure off the manager and players.

Cup competitions
The FA Cup draw was not kind on the "Valiants", as they were forced to travel to Conference play-off hopefuls Forest Green Rovers at The New Lawn. Ashley Vincent and Clayton McDonald (scoring his first goal for the club) opened the scoring, before Rovers levelled shortly after half-time; substitute Ben Williamson then scored a late winner to avoid a replay. The Second Round was also tough, particularly for Micky Adams, who was tasked with overcoming Sheffield United at Bramall Lane; the League One title chasers had sacked Adams and appointed Danny Wilson in May 2011. Ever ready with a quote, Adams said: "I just thought 'All those balls in that bag and they picked this one out'". Vale seemed certain to progress to the Third Round after Tom Pope put them into the lead, before two late goals from Shaun Miller dumped them out of the competition.

As per tradition, Vale exited the League Cup at the First Round stage. They were beaten 3–1 by Championship side Burnley.

The Football League Trophy First Round draw left Vale facing League One leaders Tranmere Rovers for the second successive season. Wishing to advance in the competition, Adams picked a strong side, and Vale won the game 2–0 thanks to a brace from Jennison Myrie-Williams, who scored with a 30-yard free kick and a penalty. For the Second Round clash with Walsall at the Bescot Stadium, Adams took the unusual move of naming his team a day in advance "to allow Vale fans a fairer chance to decide whether they think it is worth making the short trip down the M6". Nineteen-year-old goalkeeper Sam Johnson made his debut in the game, and was unable to prevent the two "Saddlers" goals in a 2–2 draw. However, in a remarkable turn of events he went on to score the winning penalty as the 22nd penalty taker of the penalty shoot-out. However suspensions weakened the team – Tom Pope's presence was especially missed – for the encounter with Bradford City, and Vale exited the competition with a 2–0 home defeat.

Results

Pre-season

Football League Two

League table

Results by matchday

Matches

FA Cup

League Cup

League Trophy

Squad statistics

Appearances and goals

Top scorers

Disciplinary record

Sourced from Soccerway.

Awards

Transfers

Transfers in

Transfers out

Loans in

Loans out

References
Specific

General
Soccerbase

Port Vale F.C. seasons
Port Vale